Martin "Markos" Akoghlyan  (born March 6, 1958, in Yerevan), is an Armenian artist.

Biography
Akoghlyan was born on March 6, 1958, Yerevan, Armenia. Between 1974–1977, he studied at Art College after Panos Terlemezyan, department of Painting. Since 2000 he is a member of the Artists' Union of Armenia, 2004 – member of the painters association "Kerpar" and a member of the painters' association "Mairakaghak" ("capital").

Akoghlyan's works are exhibited in Yerevan History Museum, Lachin State Museum (Artsakh), Noymberyan State Museum. Several works are exhibited in "Wenthword Gallery" US, in private collections of England, Canada, Israel, France, Russia, Lebanon and in other countries and in private collections of Mike Baroyan (Switzerland), Vladislav Kuznetsov (Moscow), Oleg Babajanyan (Yerevan), Jean Marie Bossy (Chardonnay) and Ciccio Pino (Palermo).

Exhibitions 
Since 1978 Martin Akoghlyan has taken part in numerous exhibitions.

Group exhibitions
1997–2000 participation in several exhibitions
2001 "Dante in Armenian Art", Ravena, Italy
2001 "Christian Armenia" devoted to the 1700 anniversary of the Christianity, Yerevan
2003 Artsakh, Berdzor
2009 Exhibition devoted to the 2791 anniversary of Yerevan, Yerevan City Council

"Kerpar" Association
2004 Paris (Sal Draq center) – auction center
2007 Folk Arts Center, Yerevan
2007 Tekeyan Art Center, Yerevan

Association "Armenian Artists of the World" 
2010 Exhibition devoted to the 2150 anniversary of Tigran the Great, Armenian National Gallery
2011 Exhibition devoted to the 1050 anniversary of Ani
2011 "The colours of Armenia", Egypt
2010 "The Spring colours of Syunik", Yerevan, "Pyunik" foundation and "Lorva dzor" patriotic union
2011 "Armenian Palette", international symposium with the participation of Armenian, Russian, Belarusian artists, Armenia, Artsakh, "Pyunik" foundation and "Lorva dzor" patriotic union
2012 "Armenian Palette", Odzun, "Pyunik" foundation and "Lorva dzor" patriotic union

Solo exhibitions
2007 HayArt center, Yerevan
2012 HayArt center, Yerevan
2016 Goris Municipal Gallery

Gallery

References

External links
 Martin Akoghlyan in Art worldwide.com
 Martin Akoghlyan, Armenia, part-1

1958 births
Living people
Artists from Yerevan
20th-century Armenian painters
21st-century Armenian painters